Charles Borromée Haentjens (born 27 November 1821 - 21 July 1874), was a Haitian diplomat and politician.

Biography
Haentjens was the son of a merchant named Charles Christian Haëntjens, whose family moved to Nantes. Charles Haentjens returned to Paris in diplomacy as the Secretary of the Legation of Haiti from 1859 to 1863, where he conducted business from 1863 to 1864.

He was made State Secretary of Finance, Trade and External Relations of Haiti in 1871, then from 1873 to 1874. His son, Clément Haentjens also followed a diplomatic career and would be the State Secretary of Agriculture and Public Works.

References

External links
François Blancpain, Un siècle de relations financières entre Haïti et la France : 1825-1922, 2001
Revue de la Société haïtienne d'histoire et de géographie, Volumes 170 à 180, 1991
Antoine Michel, La XIVe législature ..., 1932
Armelle Pouliquen, Histoire et généalogie de la famille Haentjens de Nantes, 1620-1999

1821 births
1874 deaths
Foreign Ministers of Haiti
Finance ministers of Haiti
Government ministers of Haiti
Haitian diplomats
People from Port-au-Prince